The International Korfball Federation (IKF) is the governing body of korfball. IKF is responsible for the organisation of korfball's major international tournaments, notably the IKF World Korfball Championship.

The IKF was founded on 11 June 1933 in Antwerp, Belgium as a continuation of the International Korfball Bureau established in 1924 by the Dutch and Belgian Associations. The headquarters is in Utrecht, Netherlands, since December 2020, moving from Zeist. The IKF is officially recognized by the International Olympic Committee (IOC) in 1993 and is affiliated to SportAccord, the Association of the IOC Recognized International Sports Federations (ARISF) and the International World Games Association (IWGA).

The IKF aims to spread korfball around the globe and increase the level of play in the affiliated countries. The IKF has 69 member countries. It provides the affiliated countries via five Continental Confederations (Africa, Americas, Asia, Europe and Oceania) with financial, material and structural support to achieve the goals. It has established a network of contacts in many countries and is constantly expanding this network. IKF actively promotes the game by transferring knowledge internationally by exchange programs and inviting selected korfball players, coaches and administrators to its training courses in order to assist in the creation of a stable local organization and structure in all the affiliated countries.

In response to the 2022 Russian invasion of Ukraine, on 1 March 2022, the International Korfball Federation announced that the Russian Korfball Federation would not be invited until further notice to any international korfball competition. This implied effectively that no Russian athletes shall take part in any international korfball event. Furthermore, the Russian Korfball Federation shall not be eligible to bid for the hosting of any IKF event until further notice, and no IKF events were planned in Russia.

Structure 

The IKF has 69 members at the moment. They are divided over five continental confederations for Europe, Asia, Americas, Africa and Oceanian. In 2018 the latest member to join was Thailand.

Members by Regions
 

69 Members:

Presidents

The IKF has had seven presidents until now. All seven have been from the Netherlands.

Council 

The Council of the IKF consists of a President, a Secretary General, a Senior Vice-President, three other members of the Executive Committee and up to five Continental Vice-Presidents.

IKF structured tournaments

National team tournaments 
 IKF World Korfball Championship
 IKF European Korfball Championship
 IKF Pan American Korfball Championship
 IKF Asian Oceanian Korfball Championship
 IKF African Korfball Championship
 World Games

Club tournaments 
 IKF Europa Korfball Cup
 IKF Europa Korfball Shield
 IKF Europa Korfball Bowl

National youth team tournaments  
 IKF U23 World Korfball Championship
 IKF U23 Pan American Korfball Championship
 IKF U23 Asian Oceanian Korfball Championship
 IKF U21 World Korfball Championship
 IKF U21 European Korfball Championship
 IKF U19 Korfball World Cup
 IKF U17 Korfball World Cup

University tournaments 

 IKF University World Korfball Cup
 IKF University Asian Korfball Championship

Beach Korfball tournaments 

 IKF World Beach Korfball Championship

See also
 List of national korfball associations

References

External links
 

Korfball
International sports organizations
Korfball governing bodies
Korfball in the Netherlands
Sports governing bodies in the Netherlands
Organisations based in Utrecht (city)